Kenneth James Funston (3 December 1925 – 15 April 2005) was a South African cricketer who played in 18 Test matches between 1952 and 1958.

His son, Graham, played first-class cricket in South Africa in the 1970s.

References

1925 births
2005 deaths
South Africa Test cricketers
South African cricketers
Free State cricketers
Northerns cricketers
Gauteng cricketers